Tugun is a beach-side coastal suburb in the City of Gold Coast, Queensland, Australia.

It borders New South Wales. Some locals refer to the suburb as Tugz (pronounced choo-gs).

Geography

Tugun Heights is a neighbourhood in the western and more elevated parts of the suburb.

Flat Rock is a flat rocky area along the beach that marks the boundary between Tugun and neighbouring Currumbin to the north.

Tugun Beach extends from Flat Rock south to the boundary with neighbouring Bilinga to the south-east, although the beach itself continues along the Bilinga coast but is known there as Bilinga Beach.

Tugun is a holiday destination, with a number of holiday units and motels lining Tugun Beach. Tugun has a number of shops located on its Golden-Four Drive strip. The owner of the Jolly Swagman motel suggested the name "Golden Four Drive" for the section of the former Brisbane to Sydney Highway located closest to the beaches. A new highway was constructed further to the west and the local Council consulted with the community for suggestions about naming the bypassed section of the older highway. "Golden Four" was a local name that referred to the four southern golden beaches of Tugun Beach, Bilinga Beach, North Kirra Beach (in Bilinga), and Kirra Beach (in Kirra).

The Gold Coast Oceanway, a pedestrian and cyclist pathway, connects Tugun with neighbouring Currumbin and Bilinga.

History

The name Tugun is believed to have derived from an Indigenous word of unknown dialect meaning "breaking waves".

Tugun Baptist Church opened in February 1925 on two parcels of land donated by Mrs J. H. Morgan.   

In 1959, St Monica's Catholic Church was opened, able to accommodate 150 people. In 1970, it was extended by half. In 1990, it was re-oriented and extended by half again. In 1996, St Monica's Samaritan Centre was established beside the church; it is used by Centacare to provided services for disabled people. 

Tugun Bowls Club was established in 1967.

All Saints' Anglican Church was dedicated on 1 November 1980 by Bishop Administror Ralph Wicks. It was conscrecrated on 11 November 1984 by Archbishop John Grindrod. Its closure on 22 September 1999 was approved by Assistant Bishop Ron Williams.

The junction of the Pacific and Gold Coast highways was notoriously traffic-clogged but has improved markedly upon completion of the Tugun Bypass in June 2008.

The median age of the Tugun population was 39 years, 2 years above the national median of 37.  76.1% of people living in Tugun were born in Australia. The other top responses for country of birth were New Zealand 5.3%, England 4%, Scotland 0.6%, Japan 0.6%, Canada 0.5%.  89.5% of people spoke only English at home; the next most common languages were 0.7% Japanese, 0.5% Portuguese, 0.4% Italian, 0.4% Mandarin, 0.3% Spanish.

Heritage listings
There are a number of heritage sites in Tugun, including:

 16 San Michele Street: Ar Dee (beach house)
 Toolona Street (corner Golden Four Drive): Tugun Hotel Moreton Bay Fig Tree

Facilities
John Flynn Private Hospital is at 42 Inland Drive. It provides acute cardiac care in addition to general medical and surgical services.

Amenities
The Gold Coast City Council operated a fortnightly mobile library service which visited Station Street and Toolona Street, but this was paused indefinitely due to the COVID-19 pandemic.

St Monica's Catholic Church is at  485 Golden Four Drive.

The Living Template Church (formerly Tugun Baptist Church) is at 24 Toolona Street.

Tugun Bowls Club is in Kaleena Street. It has three lawn bowling greens with restaurant and bar facilities available to members and visitors. 

Tugun Surf Lifesaving Club is on the beachfront at 29 O'Connor Street. In addition to patrolling the beach in the warmer months, the club also participates in lifesaving sports events and has bistro and bar facilities. 

A number of well-known sporting teams represent the local area, including the Tugun Seahawks, the local rugby league club who play home games at Betty Diamond Complex.

Other amenities in the suburb include the Tugun Tavern.

Parks 
There are a number of parks in the area:

 Admiral Crescent Reserve
 Alex Griffiths Park

 Blamey Park

 Boyd Park

 Golden Four Park

 Honeymoon Tree Park

 Inland Drive Reserve

 Irene Street Reserve

 Kropp Park

 Kurrawong Park

 Littleford Family Park

 Mulberry Parade Reserve

 Rosewater Reserve

 Singh Park

 Starfish Court Parklands

 Toolona Park

 Triton Parade Reserve

 Tugun Hill Conservation Area

 Tugun Park

 Wyberba Street Parklands

Notable people
 Schapelle Corby, convicted drug trafficker, lived in Tugun

See also

 Tugun Bypass

References

Sources

External links

University of Queensland: Queensland Places: Tugun
Heritage Tours - Tugun (Gold Coast City Council)

Suburbs of the Gold Coast, Queensland
Coastline of Queensland